Charles Cary may refer to:

 Charles Cary, 9th Viscount Falkland (1768–1809), peer and Royal Navy captain
 Charles P. Cary (1856–1943), American educator
 Charles S. Cary (1827–1906), New York lawyer, politician and railroad executive
 Charles Allen Cary (1861–1935), American veterinarian